Anahi Sosa (born ) is an Argentine individual rhythmic gymnast. She represented her nation at international competitions. At the 2001 Pan American Gymnastics Championships she won the gold medal in the clubs event, and further a silver medal in the hoop and rope events and a bronze medal in the team all-around event. At the 2003 Pan American Games she won the bronze medal in the individual All-Around and hoops events. In 2006 she won three gold medal at the 2006 South American Games in the all-around, ball and ribbon events.

She competed at world championships, including at the 2001 World Rhythmic Gymnastics Championships 2003 World Rhythmic Gymnastics Championships and 2007 World Rhythmic Gymnastics Championships.

References

1982 births
Living people
Argentine rhythmic gymnasts
Place of birth missing (living people)
Pan American Games medalists in gymnastics
Pan American Games bronze medalists for Argentina
South American Games gold medalists for Argentina
South American Games silver medalists for Argentina
South American Games medalists in gymnastics
Gymnasts at the 2003 Pan American Games
Competitors at the 1998 South American Games
Competitors at the 2002 South American Games
Competitors at the 2006 South American Games
Medalists at the 2003 Pan American Games
21st-century Argentine women